Lone Sørensen (born 8 June 1962) is a Danish sailor. She competed in the women's 470 event at the 1988 Summer Olympics.

References

External links
 

1962 births
Living people
Danish female sailors (sport)
Olympic sailors of Denmark
Sailors at the 1988 Summer Olympics – 470
Sportspeople from Frederiksberg